Ormsavatnet is a lake in the municipality of Bykle in Agder county, Norway. The  lake flows into the Vatndalsvatnet via a dam and canal. The lake is located in the Setesdalsheiene mountains near the lakes Store Urevatn, Holmevatnet, and Hartevatnet.

See also
List of lakes in Aust-Agder
List of lakes in Norway

References

Bykle
Lakes of Agder